"Manhattan Spiritual" is an instrumental musical piece written by Billy Maxted and first performed by the Reg Owen Orchestra. It reached #10 on the US pop chart and #20 on the UK Singles Chart in 1959.  It was featured on their 1958 album Manhattan Spiritual.

The single ranked #86 on Billboard's Year-End Hot 100 singles of 1959.

Other charting versions
Sandy Nelson released a version of the song as a single in 1969 which reached #119 on the US pop chart.
Mike Post released a version of the song as a single in 1975 which reached #28 on the US adult contemporary chart and #56 on the US pop chart.

Other versions
Francis Bay and His Orchestra released a version of the song as a single in the UK in 1958, but it did not chart.
Joe Loco and His Orchestra released a version of the song on their 1959 album "Happy-Go-Loco".
Henri René and His Orchestra released a version of the song on their 1969 album The Swinging 59.
The Stargazers released a version of the song as the B-side to their 1960 UK single "Three Beautiful Words".
Eric Delaney released a version of the song on his 1962 album At the London Palladium.  He released it as a single in 1963, but it did not chart.
Santo & Johnny released a version of the song as a single in 1963, but it did not chart.
Joe Leahy released a version of the song as the B-side to his 1966 Canadian single "Gilligan".
B. Bumble and the Stingers released a version of the song as the B-side to their 1972 UK single "Down at Mother's Place".
Jack Parnell released a version of the song on his 1976 album The Big Band Show.

References

1958 songs
1958 singles
1963 singles
1969 singles
1975 singles
Sandy Nelson songs
Santo & Johnny songs
Imperial Records singles
MGM Records singles
Philips Records singles
Canadian-American Records singles
Pop instrumentals
1950s instrumentals